Amerianna carinata is a species of freshwater air-breathing snails, aquatic pulmonate gastropod mollusks in the family Planorbidae, the ram's horn snails, or planorbids. Like all other planorbids it has a sinistral or left-coiling shell.

Distribution
The type locality is Boyne River, Queensland, Australia.

It was introduced to Martinique.

Human use
It is a part of ornamental pet trade for freshwater aquaria.

References

Planorbidae
Gastropods described in 1861